The small big-eared brown bat (Histiotus montanus) is a species of vesper bat in the family Vespertilionidae. It can be found in  Argentina, Bolivia, Brazil, Chile, Colombia, Ecuador, Peru, Uruguay, and Venezuela.

References

Histiotus
Mammals described in 1861
Bats of South America
Mammals of the Andes
Mammals of Patagonia
Mammals of Argentina
Mammals of Bolivia
Mammals of Chile
Mammals of Colombia
Mammals of Peru
Taxonomy articles created by Polbot